Louisa Stuart Costello (9 October 1799 – 24 April 1870) was an Anglo-Irish writer on travel and French history, said to have been born either in Ireland or Sussex.

Life and work
Costello lived in Paris, France, near the River Seine (according to her death certificate). She had no true home, but went from place to place staying with friends and acquaintances. She and her brother Dudley Costello, also well known for travel writing, promoted the copying of illuminated manuscripts. By the age of 15 she had become a proficient artist and later her earnings from miniature painting were enough to support her mother and to keep her brother while he attended Sandhurst.

She wrote over 100 texts, articles, poems and songs, and knew such people as Sir Walter Scott, Charles Dickens, Lord Byron, Thomas Moore. She was also a historian, painter and novelist. Her father, Colonel James Francis Costello, died in April 1814 while fighting against Napoleon.

Among Costello's published works is her self-illustrated Memoirs of Eminent Englishwomen (1844), and several popular works of poetry and travel. Her collection Songs of a Stranger was dedicated to William Lisle Bowles. She returned to France only after her mother sent for her in 1815 or 1818, and then lived chiefly in Paris as a miniature-painter.

The Maid of the Cyprus Isle (1815) was among many books of travel, which were very popular, as were her novels, which drew chiefly on French history. Another work is Specimens of the Early Poetry of France (1835). Her book The Rose Garden of Persia (1887) contains versions of poems or poem extracts taken from Persian, illustrated with imitations of Persian illuminations. There were reissues in 1888, 1899 and 1913.

She died in Boulogne sur Mer, France, of mouth cancer.

References

Further reading
Clare Broome Saunders: Louisa Stuart Costello: a nineteenth-century writing life, New York, NY: Palgrave Macmillan, [2015],

External links

Louisa Stuart Costello papers at the Sophia Smith Collection, Smith College Special Collections

1799 births
1870 deaths
19th-century travel writers
Irish travel writers
Irish women non-fiction writers
Irish poets
Irish artists
Irish women poets
People from County Mayo
Women travel writers
19th-century poets
19th-century Irish women writers
19th-century Irish writers
Deaths from oral cancer
Deaths from cancer in France